Abutilon icanum, also known as hoary abutilon, pelotazo, pelotazo chico, tronadora, and mao (Hawaii), is a shrub widespread throughout the arid, warm regions of the southwestern United States and northern Mexico as well as Hawaii.

The  fruits are capsules with 4–6 cells.

Requiring warm-season rain and mild winters, it is found in the Sonoran Desert, but not the Mojave Desert.

References

External links
 Abutilon incanum information from the Hawaiian Ecosystems at Risk project (HEAR)

incanum
Flora of Arizona
Flora of Baja California
Flora of Hawaii
Flora of Sinaloa
Flora of Sonora
Plants described in 1822
Flora of Baja California Sur